Batu Kentonmen Komuter station or Batu Cantonment Komuter station is an at grade commuter train station located at the 4.5th miles of Jalan Ipoh, a major road and residential suburb of Kuala Lumpur. The station is named after the Batu Cantonment (Malay: Batu Kentomen), an army detention centre and army weapons depot located beside the station. The station is built as a feeder station for a number of residential neighbourhoods, and is integrated with the adjacent military base, as sheltered walkways are built allowing military staff convenient use of the station. Slightly off platform, a line from the main line branches of into the camp.

The station is designed to be disabled friendly with lifts to platforms and ramps to the ticketing office. The main platforms of the station are fully covered by metal roofings.

Name 
During British colonial rule, and until the 1980s, Batu Kentonmen station was known as Kent Station.

Connection to MRT Putrajaya Line 
Batu Kentonmen Komuter station is within walking distance of, but not integrated with, the Kentonmen MRT Station on the Putrajaya Line.

References

Railway stations in Kuala Lumpur
Railway stations opened in 2010
Seremban Line